The Demon Awakens is a fantasy novel  by American writer R.A. Salvatore, the first book in the first Demon Wars Saga trilogy. It is also the first out of seven books in the combined Demon Wars Saga.

Plot summary
Elbryan Wyndon and his childhood friend Jilseponie Ault (nicknamed Pony), whose lives are irrevocably changed by the destruction of their home town Dundalis, and Avelyn Desbris who is a very pious man that enters a group of monks that go to a monastery by the name of St. Mere Abelle to study and serve under God. So while Elbryan and Pony try to sort out their lives, Avelyn comes to terms with the all-too human brothers of the church and the myriad of injustices he watches them cause. After the destruction of Elbryan’s home town he is taken in by the Touel’alfar and to their home Andur’Blough Inninnes (The Forest of Cloud) and teaches him to not just train his body, but also his mind in the ways of philosophy to become a formidable ranger. While Elbryan is training his childhood friend Pony can’t even remember her past and is trying to ease the pain of her forgotten past. While all this is happening Avelyn has problems of his own and soon has to leave the church in a most unexpected way. It is not till years later when they all meet each other and fight an evil like no other by the name of Bestesbulzibar who is a mighty demon that was reawakened by the humans weakness to rule all the realm with an army of goblins, "powries" (dwarfs), and Fomorian Giants and not only that the church is after Avelyn, too. So now this ragtag group of friends, with the help of some unlikely allies, must stop the demon and save the entire realm from its impending doom.

References

Sources
 

1998 American novels
1998 fantasy novels
American fantasy novels
Novels by R. A. Salvatore
Del Rey books